Route 25 is a , two-lane, uncontrolled-access, secondary highway in central Prince Edward Island. Its southern terminus is at Route 2 in Marshfield, and its northern terminus is at Gulf Shore Parkway East in Stanhope by the Sea. The route is entirely in Queens County.

Route description

The route begins at its southern terminus and heads north. It joins with Route 6 in Covehead and turns left later in Stanhope to leave the concurrency. It then heads northwest through Stanhope by the Sea where the route ends at its northern terminus.

Route 25A

Route 25A, also known as West Covehead Road, is the suffixed route of Route 25. Route 25A is an unposted route number.

References

025
025